The Colombian singer Shakira has made many live performances around her career, these range from concerts in various countries visited, appearances on television programs, music festivals, charity events, sports. awards and more. The vast majority have been broadcast on television, cd, internet and more, some being distributed for sale.

Since the decade of the 90s when he debuted, he has performed at awards shows and Latin programs as well as on several continents with her already characteristic style. Her performance in the Super Bowl Halftime Show with Jennifer Lopez became the most watched Halftime Show on streaming platforms, in addition to having 103 million people on television. Shakira's name generated over 2.6 million tweets which accumulated more tweets than the Super Bowl as a whole (1.85 million) placing her at number one on trending topics. Her presentation in 2005 at the MTV awards was the first time that a song was presented entirely in Spanish in the history of the awards. Shakira's first international tour called "Tour of the mongoose" in 2001 was described as "the greatest show in the history of Colombia" with a production never seen before, likewise with her "Oral Fixation World Tour" being the Latin concert highest-grossing female of all time to date. According to Pollstar Shakira has more than 2.7 million tickets since the 2000 to 2020.Shakira's concerts are named as "top-tier pop shows" while she is able to attract all types of audiences (social classes, sexual orientation, ethnicities, religions and more). Her presentations are characterized by having "her own style", some journalists assure that her show is more focused on the "artistic" and not so much on production, her performances are presented in bare feet as part of her symbology, usually going up on stage with minimal makeup and natural hair, and no background dancers in her performances, preferring to focus on her voice, dance moves, and stage presence. Some presentations made by her have been imitated by other artists, being the case of the Peruvian singer and model Leslie Shaw who made a presentation inspired by the one offered by Shakira in the year 2000 of the Latin Grammys where she performed her song "Ojos Así" from her album Dónde Están los Ladrones?. Various presentations made by Shakira in concerts and events outside these have broken attendance records, where people from different social classes and all kinds of races came.

The following examples will be classified by decades: 1990s, 2000s, 2010 and 2020.

Reviews 
Several Shakira concerts have been designed by various media, magazines such as Rolling Stone, Billboard or others write articles about her shows, scenery, songs and performance on stage, her concerts are considered an "explosion of culture" where she is able to attract audiences from all over the world (different nationalities, cultures, religions, orientations, politics, gender) among others. According to Pollstar, Shakira has managed to sell more than 2 million tickets for her concerts from the 2000s to the present. Various presentations made by Shakira in concerts and events outside these have broken attendance records, where people from different social classes and all kinds of races came. Some of her concerts are taken for analysis by university students where they review her scenery in more depth among others. Some of her presentations were innovative in countries like Peru where she revolutionized the lighting system during her concert offered at "La Feria del Hogar", also the concert of the "Mongoose Tour" was called "The Greatest Concert in the history of Colombia" .

Production 
Shakira's concerts have always been described as very artistic, not so focused on production, costumes or dancers, according to Carolina Maldonado from Her Campus, who highlights Shakira's impact on women and their image. Unlike most pop stars, and despite being "beautiful" and "fierce", Carolina says that "Shakira rarely straightens her hair or wears makeup when performing. She is not usually seen in heels." or super exaggerated outfits. On stage, she is who she is and all of her performances are based on her talent. She doesn't need a bunch of lights, dancers, props, or even a crazy stage set to attract and hold the attention of her audience. Her performances simple, in which she usually goes barefoot, are a tribute to the art of dance. It's just her and her microphone". This has impacted several Latina female artists like Rosalía to trust their talents and their roots instead of their looks. According to a Colombian television program, until the date of the mongoose tour in 2001, no Latin country had witnessed a concert with the production and assembly that Shakira was offering at that time. In 2012 at the University of Lima it was possible to carry out a small analysis of her concerts "Tour Anfibio" and the "Oral Fixation Tour" where a deeper observation of the psychology of color present in both concerts, the designs of each stage highlighting the absence of production as in other singers, but Shakira directs everything towards the most artistic.

Decade of 1990

Viña del Mar (1993) 
Shakira, with only 16 years of age, in 1993, made her first presentation at the Viña del Mar festival in the country of Chile, representing Colombia, presenting her song "Eres" from her album "Peligro" released at that time, although she did not win, placing third. place without taking the prize of the night, however calling that night as "With this presentation began the journey of the star of Barranquilla" According to the media and Shakira herself, this presentation was a determining point in her career as well as her first big step on the international stage. According to the Peruvian newspaper La República, Shakira's presentation at the festival.

Feria del Hogar (1996) 
In 1996 Shakira was invited to perform in Peru during the annual event "Feria del hogar" for its 30th anniversary where she performed several of her famous songs up to then from her first international album "Pies Descalzos" managing to put on a show two consecutive days. With an audience of 20,000 people, some magazines describe this presentation as the beginning of her popularity in the Peruvian public that would make it a youth phenomenon during the 90s. Shakira's show given at the "Feria del Hogar" is described as "one of the most remembered moments in the history of the festival"

Mtv Unplugged (1999) 
In 1999 Shakira was invited by MTV to record an MTV Unplugged from her album ¿Dónde Están los Ladrones? There were a total of three concerts given, being the one held at the Grand Ballroom in New York City. Although at the beginning Shakira had contemplated using wild animals such as snakes and tigers while interpreting her songs, although the idea was discarded for the safety of the public. The show awarded was highly acclaimed by the media, positioning her show as one of the best MTV Unplugged in history and her specific performance of "Sombra de tí" is considered one of the best presentations made at those events.

Decade of 2000

Latin Grammy Awards (2000) 
In 2000, the first Latin Grammy took place in the city of Los Angeles, California, where Shakira performed singing "Ojos Así" from her album "Dónde Están los Ladrones?" to continue promoting it. For the event, she wore a red bodysuit along with an Arabic dance belt. It is rated as one of the most memorable moments of the Latin Grammys to date. According to Billboard this ceremony was seen by a total of 7.5 million people on television.

Radio Music Awards (2001) 
On October 26, 2001, Shakira appeared at the Aladdin Theater for the Radio Music Awards in New York City, performing her song "Whenever, Wherever".The show was broadcast live on ABC.

VH1 Divas Las Vegas (2001) 
In 2001 Shakira was part of the main participants for the VH1 Divas Las Vegas event: an honor concert for the VH1 Save The Music Foundation that was broadcast live from the MGM Grand Las Vegas on May 23, 2002. Performing her song "Underneath Your Clothes" from her album Laundry Service and a cover of Elvis Presley and a cover with Mary J. Blige of the song "Love is a Battlefield" by Pat Benatar.

MTV Video Music Awards (2002) 
On 29 August 2002, Shakira performed "Objection (Tango)" at the 2002 MTV Video Music Awards in New York City. Instead of tango, the performance of the song was inspired by samba and featured a large number of percussionists on the stage. Shakira incorporated belly dancing moves in her choreography and near to the end of the performance, she fell backward into the crowd and "was delivered back to the stage quickly enough not to miss a single line".

Party in the Park (2002) 
During the promotion of Shakira's crossover album, she appeared at the summer concert "Party in the Park" in London invited by Prince Charles of England, where she sang a setlist of "Whenever, Wherever", "Underneath Your Clothes" and "Objection (Tango) "

Grammys (2007) 
Thanks to the success obtained with "Hips Don't Lie" in 2006, Shakira was invited to the Grammys in 2007 where she presented her song with rapper Wyclef Jean, Inspired by the aesthetics of Bollywood films, the performance features a cast of dancers dressed in metallic gold outfits and a dazzling illuminated archway that shines behind the performers. the singer rocked a midriff-baring gold two-piece ensemble while the rapper kept things comparatively casual, donning tan loungewear.

Fifa World Cup Closing Ceremony (2006) 
On 9 June 2006, Shakira and Wyclef Jean performed "Hips Don't Lie" at the opening ceremony of the 2006 FIFA World Cup in Munich, and also a month later at the short ceremony preceding the final game in Berlin, to worldwide TV audiences of over 500 million and 700 million people.

Rock in Rio (2008) 
On July 4, 2008, Shakira appeared at the Rock in Rio festival for the first time in front of an audience of 75,000 people dressed in a black vest and pants, opening the show with her song "Te Dejo Madrid" while touring her discography inviting some colleagues at the concert like Alejandro Sanz who joined her to sing "La Tortura"

American Music Awards (2009) 
On November 22, 2009, Shakira wearing a mirrored black dress and "big" hair performed her song "Give It Up To Me", according to MTV the dancers took over the aisles of the auditorium, they began to dance while Shakira sang while they flattered her performance saying it "set the tone for a night of girl power"

Decade of 2010

Fifa World Cup Opening Ceremony 2010 
Shakira was chosen by FIFA to make the official anthem of the 2010 World Cup held in South Africa. Shakira performed "Waka Waka (This Time for Africa)" at the 2010 FIFA World Cup opening ceremony on 10 June at the Orlando Stadium in Johannesburg, South Africa. The song was preceded by performances of her past singles "Hips Don't Lie" and "She Wolf". Freshlyground also appeared on the stage and Mahola sang her verse of the song. Numerous African dancers and musicians accompanied Shakira during the performance. For the performances, Shakira was dressed in a black and white zebra-print jumpsuit coupled with a silk-fringed skirt and bracelets made of brown leather and silver pearls. Her outfit was designed by Italian fashion designer Roberto Cavalli. Diane Coetzer from Billboard praised the performance and called it the "crowning moment" of the concert show. Although critical of Cavalli's costume, Los Angeles Times critic Ann Powers complimented Shakira's performance of the three songs and commended her incorporation of native dancers and musicians in the show, writing: "It was just a symbolic gesture, but a strong one in this evening-long review of pop music's journey from Africa to every corner of the earth, and back."

NBA All-Star Halftime Show (2010) 
On February 14, 2010, Shakira was one of the artists that appeared at said event presenting "She Wolf" and "Give It Up to Me", the third single off the album, during the halftime of the 2010 NBA All-Star Game, Shakira emerged in a black military-style dress from a cage, and her dancers gyrated and tossed their hair wildly through Shakira's songs.

Rock in Rio (2010) 
In 2010, Shakira performed before more than 85,000 people at the Rock in Rio festival held in Madrid, Spain, wearing a minimal decorated outfit that consisted of a gold bustier, black tuxedo pants and boots, offered a repertoire for her hit songs from Her previous albums such as "Te Dejo Madrid", "Inevitable", "Whenever, Wherever", "Ciega, Sordomuda" among others.

Latin Grammy Awards (2011) 
In 2011 she was awarded the "Person of the Year" award and recognition, being the youngest artist to receive that award and the second woman after Gloria Estefan, Shakira received a tribute from various artists singing her previous songs such as "Blind, Sordomuda " or "Objection (Tango)" also appeared later singing her song "Antes de las seis" from her album "Sale el Sol" to promote it.

Glastonbury (2011) 
In 2011 Shakira performed a show at the music festival in the UK Glastonbury presenting hits from her repertoire such as: Hips Don't Lie, Inevitable, She Wolf, Waka Waka, Underneath Your Clothes, Whenever, Wherever among others. For the presentation Shakira wore tight black pants and a sleeveless shirt, for the Ojos Así segment she used her classic Belly Dance belt. It was well received by critics where The Guardian gave it 4 stars out of 5.

New Year China (2011) 
For the new year in China, the company Jiangsu Satellite TV confirmed that Shakira would join to celebrate the new year in the Asian country specifically in the city of Nankín, Shakira made a brief appearance singing her classics: Hips Don't Lie, Waka Waka and Ojos Así.

Fifa Women's World Cup (2012) 
On October 13, 2012, Shakira was the great protagonist of the closing ceremony of the women's soccer world cup, which was held in Baku, Azerbaijan. Shakira wore leather pants and knee-high boots with a shiny long black top and short-sleeved jacket. Shakira gave a presentation of her songs "Loca" and "Waka Waka" from her album "Sale el Sol".

Fifa World Cup Closing Ceremony (2014) 
In 2014 Shakira was in charge of closing the FIFA World Cup Brazil due to the poor reception of Jlo and Pitbull's song "We Are One", Shakira wore a red dress during the presentation with the Brazilian singer Carlinhos Brown at the stadium Maracana.

Global Citizen Festival (2017) 
In 2017 Shakira made an appearance at the Global Citizen Festival held in Hamburg, Germany, she appeared with the vocalist of the band Coldplay, Chris Martin presenting a cover of "Yellow", along with the hits "Chantaje" and "Me Enamoré" belonging to the album " El Dorado" by Shakira, the show was widely acclaimed by both the public and some journalists.

Davis Cup (2019) 
In 2019 Shakira performed at the Davis Cup final in Spain, presenting her songs "She Wolf", a remix of Camilo's "Tutu" and "Lalala" from her 2014 self-titled album. For the event, Shakira wore a Navy blue bodysuit with diamonds that was decorated with fringes on a kind of skirt with tall black boots.

Decade of 2020

Super Bowl LIV Halftime Show (2020) 
At the end of the year 2019, the NFL made the official announcement that Shakira would be one of two artists to headline the Super Bowl LVI halftime show alongside Jennifer Lopez at Hard Rock Stadium in Miami, Florida on February 2, 2020. 
Roc Nation served as producers and creative directors of the show; their producers included Dan Parise. Ricky Kirshner served as the show's executive producer and Hamish Hamilton served as director. TJaquel Knight, Nadine Eliya, and Maite Marcos were the creative directors and choreographers of Shakira's half. In mid-January, the producers announced they would recruit approximately 600 field team members to assist with the performance. Ultimately, 670 team field members were enlisted. one of the main managers to perform the choreography of the champeta that Shakira danced during the Super Bowl Halftime Show was Liz Dany. The lighting equipment used a total of 113 Ayrton Perseo equipment and 60 units of Claypaky's Xtylos laser source beam, as well as 12 Sharpy moving heads. And, for the control, there was a GrandMA2 console from MA Lighting. Among the more than 700 luminaires that made up this design, a total of 113 units of Ayrton's Perseus were installed, the new model of the French brand cataloged with IP65. Placed on the catwalk along which the artists moved, they provided background lighting creating aerial effects. Reviewer Chris Willman of Variety wrote "Costumers deserve almost as much credit as the choreographers here." Shakira's set had three costume changes; each piece was custom-made by Norwegian designer Peter Dundas. Her first was a red, cropped bustier with a cross-straps top that was paired with a removable corset and fringed skirt, each of which were covered with 123,000 Swarovski crystals in three shades of red. This was paired with crystal-accented leather cuffs and knee-high boots that were made by the designer Daniel Jacob. The boots were covered with 30,000 Swarovski crystals and took ten days to create. Shakira then made a mid-performance costume change to reveal a fringed, feathered skirt that was previously hidden under a sarong. Her final costume was an entirely new ensemble consisting of a bomber jacket covered in gold sequin embroidery and gold-and-white Swarovski crystals on a matching gold sequin crop top, which she wore with matching high-waisted hot pants and Dundas-customized Adidas Superstar sneakers. During the show, Shakira presented a setlist of her entire career, interpreting her most emblematic songs from the 90s, 2000s and 2010s. Starting with She Wolf, which contained excerpts from her song "Lalala (Brazil 2014)" to later move on to "Empire" from her self-titled album. which contained parts of her song "Inevitable" and Led Zeppelin's "Kashmir" immediately to switch to 1998's "Ojos Así" and transition into "Whenever, Wherever" from her album "Laundry Service", Bad Bunny joined her to sing Cardi B's "I Like It" which contained elements of "En Barranquila me quedo" to move into a mashup between "Chantaje (Versión Salsa)" and "Callaíta" ending her first part with "Hips Don' t Lie". After Jlo's performance Shakira returned to the stage to perform "Waka Waka" (which contained excerpts from "Champeta") ending the show with Jlo dancing an excerpt from "Aguianile".
The show generated great attention from television and radio media due to the "great erotic content" by both Shakira and Jlo in their presentations. However, the performance was a great success with an increase of 4% in the audience compared to previous years, on social networks such as Twitter the name Shakira became a world trend, surpassing the Super Bowl itself and Shakira ended up being the most popular female artist. searched on Google from the year 2020. Although like other artists Shakira was not paid for her performance, Shakira received a large increase in average concert revenue in the Super Bowl year. According to sites like Rolling Stone, Vulture, NFL and more, this show is considered among the best Halftime Shows in Super Bowl history. The show came second to only Queen's 1985 Live Aid performance as the world's most popular live performance in history.

Jon Pareles of The New York Times lauded the performance, calling it an improvement over the previous year's halftime. He called the show "a no-nonsense affirmation of Latin pride and cultural diversity in a political climate where immigrants and American Latinos have been widely demonized", called Shakira and Lopez "Latina superwomen, smiling pop conquistadoras backed by phalanxes of dancers", and calling the show "euphoria with a purpose". David Bauder of the Associated Press wrote Lopez and Shakira "infused the Super Bowl halftime show with an exuberance and joy that celebrated their Latina heritage". He also wrote, "Their breathless athleticism matched that of the football players waiting in the locker room" but called J Balvin's and Bad Bunny's guest appearances "superfluous". Greg Kot of the Chicago Tribune wrote, "Prince's 2007 Super Bowl performance is still king of halftime, but Shakira and J Lo were certainly the most undeniable performance since then". Bobby Olivier of NJ.com described the halftime show as "high-octane, relentless Latin pop fun", adding it was "a blazing performance that should challenge Lady Gaga and Beyoncé as some of the best halftime sets of the past decade or so".

Other concerts

TV Appearances

List of reviews 
Below is a table with some examples of the lists that the media collect or survey about the performances of various activities, which have included many performed by Shakira.

Gallery

Performances

Audience

See also 

 List of Shakira Concerts
 Cultural Impact of Shakira
 Shakira Fandom
 List of Shakira records and achievements

References 

Shakira